Mattaponi Church is a historic Baptist Church (formerly an Episcopal Church) located near Cumnor, King and Queen County, Virginia. As English settlement advanced through present-day King and Queen County, the original Anglican parish, Stratton Major, was divided in 1674, forming St. Stephen's Parish to the northwest. In 1730, construction commenced on a new "Lower Church" for St. Stephen's Parish which was completed around 1734. The structure is designed in a cruciform plan executed in Georgian style. Of particular note are the church's three entrances, which have rubbed brick pilasters and pediments, two achieved in triangular form (north and south doorways) and one in semicircular form (west doorway). The entire church is built of bricks laid in Flemish bond. St. Stephen's Church was used for Anglican worship until the American Revolution when it was abandoned. In 1803, the church was occupied by a Baptist congregation which continues to worship in the historic church today. When the Baptists assumed ownership of the church, it was renamed Mattaponi. Fire gutted the interior of the church in 1922, but it was restored and remains well preserved. Today, historic Mattaponi Baptist Church houses the original wall tablets displaying the Decalogue, Creed, and Lord's Prayer, as well as a Bible dated 1753.

It was listed on the National Register of Historic Places in 1973.

References

Churches on the National Register of Historic Places in Virginia
Baptist churches in Virginia
Churches completed in 1734
Churches in King and Queen County, Virginia
National Register of Historic Places in King and Queen County, Virginia
18th-century Baptist churches in the United States